Santa Rosa High School (SRHS) is a secondary school located in Santa Rosa, California. It is part of the Santa Rosa City High School District, which is itself part of Santa Rosa City Schools. Santa Rosa High School has 1,991 students as of the 2017-2018 school year.

History
SRHS was the only public high school for Santa Rosa from 1874 to 1958. Santa Rosa Junior College (SRJC), located on the adjacent property, was actually a part of Santa Rosa High School from 1918 to 1927.

The school had several locations. The previous location on Humboldt Street burned to the ground in 1921. The school was moved to its current location and opened in 1924. The school's current Brick Gothic design was created by W. H. Weeks in 1922.

In 2011 Santa Rosa High School received the California Distinguished School and the California Career Technical Awards.

In 2015 Santa Rosa High School received the California Gold Ribbon Award, which replaced the California Distinguished Schools Award as the highest award a school can receive from the state of California.

Nevers Field 
Ernie Nevers attended Santa Rosa High School, where he excelled in football. In 1920, as a senior, he led the team to the NCS Championships. He went on to attend Stanford University, and play for the Duluth Eskimos and the Chicago Cardinals of the National Football League. In 1925 the football field at Santa Rosa High School was renamed Nevers Field in his honor. In 2004, just in time for the homecoming game, a $2 million refurbishment of Nevers Field was completed. The improvements included an artificial turf, an all-weather 8-lane track, new bleachers, a snack bar and ticket booth, restrooms, and lights for night games.

Extracurricular Activities

Sports 
Santa Rosa High School has a wide variety of athletic programs and competes in the 5-A North Bay League of the North Coast Section of the California Interscholastic Federation. The teams are known as the Santa Rosa Panthers. Sports offered include football, volleyball, cross country, tennis, golf, basketball, wrestling, soccer, baseball, softball, track and field, badminton, and swimming. The cross country varsity boys team was the undefeated league champions, a record of 7-0, in the 2008-2009 season. In the 2016 swim season, both men's and women's varsity teams were undefeated with 7-0 records. In the 2017 school season, the boys team was similarly undefeated.

ArtQuest 
ArtQuest is a magnet program for Santa Rosa High School that allows students to take classes with a focus on the arts. ArtQuest has specialty course work in visual fine arts, dance, theatre arts, photography, instrumental and vocal music, digital arts, and video. It was  awarded the prestigious Jack London Award for Educational Excellence.

School Newspaper 
Santa Rosa High School has a journalism class that produces newspapers about once a month. Entitled The Santa Rosan, it has consistently won awards at the annual Press Democrat competition, among others, and in 2012 won second overall.

Clubs 
Santa Rosa High School has several student-organized and teacher-supervised clubs, ranging from many different subjects. Some of the groups include anime club, arts and writing club, chess club, debate club, Gay-Straight Alliance (GSA), InterKey, math club, National Honor Society (NHS), and the writer's group.

Foundation 
The Santa Rosa High School Foundation is a group of alumni who take an active interest in SRHS. The Foundation helps raise money for school programs and other services.

In films
Santa Rosa High School was used for several Hollywood movies, including Peggy Sue Got Married (1986) and Inventing the Abbotts (1997).

Director Wes Craven applied for the use of Santa Rosa High School and reached a verbal agreement with the principal of the school for the filming of his 1996 horror film Scream. Just days before filming was to begin, the school board denied permission for the use of the school. In response, following the listing of organizations and individuals whom the filmmakers wished to thank in the closing credits of Scream, Craven included the note, "No thanks whatsoever to the Santa Rosa City School District Governing Board".

Notable alumni
 Doug Camilli (born 1936), baseball catcher
 Efren Carrillo, two-time member of the Sonoma County Board of Supervisors
 Tim Cossins (born 1970), baseball coach
 Gabe Cramer (born 1994), Israeli-Canadian-American baseball pitcher
 Brett E. Crozier, class of 1988, United States Navy Captain
 Daniel Farrands, class of 1987, producer and screenwriter of Halloween: The Curse of Michael Myers and The Haunting in Connecticut
 Chuck Girard, class of 1961, rock and roll recording artist, Love Song
 Kevin Kwan Loucks, class of 2000, CEO of Chamber Music America; co-founder of Chamber Music OC; member of classical music ensemble Trio Céleste
 Hector Andres Negroni, Air Force fighter pilot, aerospace defense executive, historian
 Ernie Nevers, Pro Football Hall of Fame fullback who played for Duluth Eskimos and Chicago Cardinals of National Football League, major league baseball player
 Robert Ripley, cartoonist and creator of Ripley's Believe It or Not!
 Rolando Toyos, ophthalmologist who developed intense pulsed light treatment for eye conditions
 Peter Schmidt, class of 1961, archaeologist of Africa, fellow of World Academy of Art and Science, Professor of Anthropology—Brown University and University of Florida. Author and editor of 15 books on African archaeology and heritage.

Notable faculty
Edward Von der Porten (1933-2018) early nautical archaeologist; expert on Sir Francis Drake's visit to New Albion in 1579; expert in early Chinese export porcelains; author on the German Navy in WW II, Francis Drake and Chinese porcelains. Led efforts leading to the Drakes Bay National Historic and Archeological National Historic Landmark in 2012.

See also
List of school districts in Sonoma County, California

References
Time Magazine, Sept. 28, 1978.

External links
 

High schools in Santa Rosa, California
Educational institutions established in 1874
W. H. Weeks buildings
Public high schools in California
1874 establishments in California